Kulai Shree Vishnumurthy Temple is located in the town of Kulai near Surathkal about 15 km north of Mangalore in the state of Karnataka, India.

It is an ancient Vishnu shrine which has a statue estimated to be about 600 years old.  The temple's presiding deity is Shree Vishnumurthy who is another form of Lord Vishnu.

Initially no temple complex was evident but Venkatramana Hebbar, a local archeologist and historian, found a small shrine in a state of ruin in the forest around 1911. The temple has been repeatedly renovated and is in use today with an active schedule of worship and festival celebrations.

Annual Festivals 
Formerly a one day Annual Festival and Nemosthava was conducted in Meena Sankramana. In Shima Masa one day flower Alankara Pooja and Abhishekam by Tender coconut, Mahaganapathi Appada Pooja is being conducted. In the year 1968 one day Annual festival was started to be celebrated as 5 days festival with various seva programs and cultural programs. Presently the festival starts on the Chathrudhasi of Meena Masa. The Festival starts with Dwajarohanam and the Rathostavam is on the 4th day of the festival, on 5th day noon Churnoostava and Maha Annasantarpane will be there and in the same day night there is Naga Darshan, Sri Annappa Panjurli Nemostava and ending with Avabrathostava.

References

External links
 Shree Vishnumurthy Temple
 Shree Vishnumurthy, Kodamanthaya and Mayamdal Devi are being worshiped in the temple - Google Video

Hindu temples in Mangalore